Egnatia Odos or Egnatia Motorway (often translated as Via Egnatia, code: A2) is the Greek part of European route . It is a motorway in Greece that extends from the western port of Igoumenitsa to the eastern Greek–Turkish border at Kipoi. The megaproject began in 1994 and was completed in 2009 at a cost of €5.93 billion ($ billion); it was managed by the state-owned company Egnatia Odos, S.A.

Geography
The route traverses the mountainous Greek regions of Epirus and Macedonia,  crossing the Pindos and Vermio mountain ranges, which posed formidable engineering challenges. It includes 76 tunnels (with a combined length of 99 km / 61.5 miles) and 1,650 bridges. It is a limited-access highway with sophisticated electronic surveillance measures, SCADA controls for the lighting/tunnel ventilation, and advanced vehicle collision absorption measures.

Stretching: From the port of Igoumenitsa, Thesprotia to the border crossing of Kipoi, on the River Evros
Total length: 670 kilometres
Serving the regional units: Thesprotia – Ioannina – Grevena – Kozani – Imathia – Thessaloniki – Kavala – Xanthi – Rhodope – Evros.
Linked with nine major vertical axes connecting to the neighbouring countries in the north (Albania, North Macedonia, Bulgaria, Turkey).
Passing through the towns of: Igoumenitsa – Ioannina – Metsovo – Grevena – Kozani – Veroia – Thessaloniki – Kavala – Xanthi – Komotini – Alexandroupolis
Linked to the Ports of: Igoumenitsa – Thessaloniki – Kavala – Alexandroupolis
Linked to the Airports of: Ioannina – Kastoria – Kozani – Thessaloniki – Kavala – Alexandroupolis
Technical characteristics: Two traffic lanes per direction, a central reserve and an emergency lane on the right.
The area served accounts for:
36% of the country's total population
33% of its total gross national product
In the primary sector, 54% of total farmland and 65% of total irrigated land
In the secondary sector, 41% of total industrial employment, and
51% of total mining activity.

The project has therefore been dubbed a modern Via Egnatia (in Greek, Egnatia Odos / Εγνατία Οδός). However, the parallel is not exact; the original Via Egnatia was much longer (1,120 km / 696 miles) and its western section, from Thessaloniki to the Adriatic Sea, ran much further north than the modern road.

The project has raised concerns for the survival of nearby sites of ecological and archaeological significance. The construction of the Pindos stretch (i.e. from Grevena to Ioannina) was delayed due to environmental concerns about the destruction of the habitat of the endangered brown bear.  However, a new routing was proposed in 2003, and this part was completed by April 2009.

In addition to the main highway, three perpendicular auxiliary highways are under construction connecting the highway to important cities, ports and airports of Macedonia.

History

94 km of the motorway had been built as part of other motorways, before the official project began in 1994. Between 1997 and 2004, 393 km of motorway were built.
The main part of the project was completed by 30 May 2009. A final bridge was opened on 10 May 2014

Exit list

The exits of the completed sections of the A2 motorway:

Gallery

Treatment of 7000 high risk sites in Greece with EIB

In 2020, EIB and Egnatia Odos are committed to fund treatment of 7000 high risk sites in Greece.

References

External links

 The official website of EGNATIA ODOS S.A. (English version)

Greek National Road 2
Motorways in Greece
Roads in Epirus (region)
Roads in Western Macedonia
Roads in Central Macedonia
Roads in Eastern Macedonia and Thrace